This is a list of butterflies of Mali. About 59 species are known from Mali, none of which are endemic.

Papilionidae

Papilioninae

Papilionini
Papilio demodocus Esper, [1798]
Papilio horribilis Butler, 1874

Leptocercini
Graphium policenes (Cramer, 1775)
Graphium angolanus baronis (Ungemach, 1932)
Graphium leonidas (Fabricius, 1793)
Graphium adamastor (Boisduval, 1836)

Pieridae

Coliadinae
Eurema brigitta (Stoll, [1780])
Eurema hecabe solifera (Butler, 1875)
Catopsilia florella (Fabricius, 1775)

Pierinae
Colotis amata calais (Cramer, 1775)
Colotis antevippe (Boisduval, 1836)
Colotis aurora evarne (Klug, 1829)
Colotis chrysonome (Klug, 1829)
Colotis danae eupompe (Klug, 1829)
Colotis evagore antigone (Boisduval, 1836)
Colotis halimede (Klug, 1829)
Colotis phisadia (Godart, 1819)
Colotis vesta amelia (Lucas, 1852)
Colotis eris (Klug, 1829)
Pinacopterix eriphia tritogenia (Klug, 1829)

Pierini
Mylothris chloris (Fabricius, 1775)
Belenois aurota (Fabricius, 1793)

Lycaenidae

Aphnaeinae
Cigaritis buchanani (Rothschild, 1921)
Cigaritis nilus (Hewitson, 1865)
Axiocerses harpax harpax (Fabricius, 1775)
Axiocerses harpax kadugli Talbot, 1935
Axiocerses amanga borealis Aurivillius, 1905

Theclinae
Hypolycaena philippus (Fabricius, 1793)
Deudorix antalus (Hopffer, 1855)

Polyommatinae

Lycaenesthini
Anthene lunulata (Trimen, 1894)

Polyommatini
Lampides boeticus (Linnaeus, 1767)
Tuxentius cretosus nodieri (Oberthür, 1883)
Tarucus theophrastus (Fabricius, 1793)
Zizeeria knysna (Trimen, 1862)
Euchrysops malathana (Boisduval, 1833)
Euchrysops sahelianus Libert, 2001
Lepidochrysops polydialecta (Bethune-Baker, [1923])

Nymphalidae

Danainae

Danaini
Danaus chrysippus alcippus (Cramer, 1777)

Satyrinae

Melanitini
Melanitis leda (Linnaeus, 1758)
Melanitis libya Distant, 1882

Satyrini
Bicyclus milyas (Hewitson, 1864)
Bicyclus pavonis (Butler, 1876)
Bicyclus vulgaris (Butler, 1868)
Ypthima condamini nigeriae Kielland, 1982

Charaxinae

Charaxini
Charaxes jasius Poulton, 1926
Charaxes epijasius Reiche, 1850

Nymphalinae

Nymphalini
Junonia chorimene (Guérin-Méneville, 1844)
Junonia hierta cebrene Trimen, 1870
Junonia oenone (Linnaeus, 1758)
Junonia orithya madagascariensis Guenée, 1865
Hypolimnas misippus (Linnaeus, 1764)

Limenitinae

Adoliadini
Hamanumida daedalus (Fabricius, 1775)

Heliconiinae

Acraeini
Acraea neobule Doubleday, 1847
Acraea caecilia (Fabricius, 1781)
Acraea serena (Fabricius, 1775)

Hesperiidae

Coeliadinae
Coeliades aeschylus (Plötz, 1884)
Coeliades forestan (Stoll, [1782])

Pyrginae

Celaenorrhinini
Sarangesa laelius (Mabille, 1877)

Carcharodini
Spialia spio (Linnaeus, 1764)

Hesperiinae

Baorini
Gegenes hottentota (Latreille, 1824)

See also
Geography of Mali
Wildlife of Mali
South Saharan steppe and woodlands
West Saharan montane xeric woodlands

References

Seitz, A. Die Gross-Schmetterlinge der Erde 13: Die Afrikanischen Tagfalter. Plates
Seitz, A. Die Gross-Schmetterlinge der Erde 13: Die Afrikanischen Tagfalter. Text 

Butterflies

Butterflies
Mali
Mali